The New Zealand Veterinary Nursing Association (NZVNA) is the representative body for veterinary nurses in New Zealand. Its purpose is to promote high standards of veterinary nursing in New Zealand.

History 
The New Zealand Veterinary Nursing Association was established in 1992 by a group of like minded veterinary nurses, seeking representation within the veterinary profession in New Zealand. As of October 2018 the membership of the association stands at just over 1160 members. Veterinary nursing in New Zealand is a profession in its own right, moving away from the previous classification of paraprofessionals.

Purpose 
The New Zealand Veterinary Nursing Association functions as the representative body for veterinary nurses in New Zealand. It provides an annual Continuing Professional Development scheme, linked closely with voluntary registration. The association produces a quarterly journal (The New Zealand Veterinary Nurse) and a regular e-newsletter to keep members up to date with current issues in the veterinary nursing profession.

Executive committee members of the association provide support to its members on a wide range of topics, including Human Resources, Health and Safety, and Regulation.  

The NZVNA set recommended wage guidelines for veterinary nurses and veterinary nursing assistants. The NZVNA oversees Continuing Professional Development (CPD) for veterinary nurses, and provides accreditation for CPD providers.

WSAVA affiliate 
The New Zealand Veterinary Nursing Association was the first representative body for veterinary nurses to be an affiliate member of the World Small Animal Veterinary Association.

IVNTA affiliate 
The New Zealand Veterinary Nursing Association is a permanent member of the International Veterinary Nurses and Technicians Association (which advocates communication and co-operation of veterinary nurses and technicians around the world).

Regulation 
In 2016, the New Zealand Veterinary Nursing Association implemented voluntary registration of veterinary nurses. Previously, there was no form of registration, or formal way of recognising veterinary nursing qualifications. Currently, registration is overseen by the New Zealand Veterinary Nursing Association, with plans for the Allied Veterinary Professional Regulatory Council (AVPRC) to take over this process in the future.

The process of regulation of veterinary nurses coincides with the New Zealand government's review of veterinary nursing education. Veterinary nursing education underwent a mandated government review in 2014/2015, with new qualifications being delivered in 2016. In 2020, new qualifications were approved by NZQA, with the main development of these into programmes for delivery being overseen by Te Pukenga. The Diploma in Veterinary Nursing is the minimum qualification required for registration.

Veterinary Nurse Awareness Week 
Every year, during the first week of October, the NZVNA celebrates Veterinary Nurse Awareness Week (VNAW), culminating on the awarding of Vet Nurse of the Year, on the Friday of VNAW.

Vet Nurse of the Year award winners 
The NZVNA and Hill's Veterinary Nurse of the Year Award was launched in 2013 to recognise New Zealand veterinary nurses who advocate and significantly contribute to the care of their patients, and who are an integral part of the veterinary health care team.

Past Presidents of NZVNA

References

External links 
 

Veterinary medicine-related professional associations
Veterinary medicine in New Zealand
1992 establishments in New Zealand
Professional associations based in New Zealand